Elizabeth Anne Le Noir (née Smart; c. 1755 – 6 May 1841) was an English female poet, novelist, and feminist from the romantic period. Raised in a widowed home, Le Noir became interested in literature through opportunities she was given by her mother's step-father; John Newbery. After being employed at the Reading Mercury for some time, Le Noir and her sister eventually inherited it. Le Noir soon became the wife of Jean Baptiste Le Noir, from whom she got her last name. Although she didn't have any children of her own, she educated two of her female relatives. Although Le Noir had many great works, "[s]he is probably better known as the daughter of the famous religious poet Christopher Smart."

Biography

Early life

In 1755, Elizabeth Anne Le Smart was born in Islington, London as the daughter of English poet Christopher Smart and Anna Maria Carnan. Elizabeth was born into a household with her parents and sister Mary Anne Smart. Due to her father's failing career, Smart was unable to provide enough of an income to support the family.  During the 1760s, Christopher Smart began to be labeled as an insane alcoholic and became incapable of caring for his wife and children. He was soon admitted into St Luke's Hospital for Lunatics as a "Curable Patient". In 1768 Smart was eventually confined permanently for insanity and later died at the King's Bench Prison in 1771. While Elizabeth Anne's father was imprisoned, she, her mother and sister settled in Reading, Berkshire in 1792 with her mother's step-father John Newbery who cared for them. An English publisher, Newbery once supported the works of Christopher Smart, and employed the three women at the Reading Mercury, which he owned. Elizabeth Anne and her sister later inherited the publication.

Adulthood

In 1795, Elizabeth Anne married a French immigrant, John Baptiste Le Noir.  The couple settled together in Reading, where Bapiste worked as a French teacher while Elizabeth Anne took care of the house and educated two family members. Throughout her childhood, Le Noir's mother did not want her to pursue writing.

Career

Starting at a young age, Le Noir was exposed to writing. With the deep interest she gained for it, she published many poems and novels. To set her apart from others, Le Noir wrote novels with poems scattered among and between them with artistic backgrounds. Her work was very beautiful and was described by Mary Russell Mitford as the type of novels that were so interesting, that you had to keep reading and refrained from putting down. Le Noir's work was admired by many others who read her novels, such as Dr. Burney who praised her first novel written in 1803; Village Anecdotes, which was dedicated to him.

Works

Her works include:

 1803 Village Annals
 1804 Village Anecdotes
 1804 Victorine's Excursion
 1808 Clara de Montfier'''
 1812 Conversations, interspersed with Poems, for the Amusement and Instruction of Youth 1825 Miscellaneous Poems, in two volumes. Dedicated to Viscountess Sidmouth.

Death
Elizabeth Anne Le Noir died on 6 May 1841 at the age of 86 at the Priory, Caversham. She outlived her husband by six years, who died at the age of 80.

References

External links
Full text of volumes I - III of Village Anecdotes'' from the Internet Archive
 * Corvey Women Writers on the Web author page

19th-century English women writers
19th-century English poets
19th-century British novelists
1755 births
1841 deaths
English women poets
English women novelists
People from Islington (district)
Writers from London